Rognlien is a surname. Notable people with the surname include:

Bjarne Rognlien (1891–?), Norwegian judge
Børre Rognlien (born 1944), Norwegian sports official and politician
Helge Rognlien (1920–2001), Norwegian politician

Norwegian-language surnames